HC Dunărea Brăila is a women's handball club from Brăila, Romania, that competes in the Liga Națională and the European League (formerly known as EHF Cup).

Kits

Team

Current squad
The squad for the 2022/23 season.
 

Goalkeepers 
 1  Elena Șerban
 16  Clara Preda
 84  Mayssa Pessoa 

Wingers
LW
 20  Larissa Araújo
 71  Jovana Sazdovska
 89  Corina Lupei
 98  Ștefania Epureanu 
RW 
 7  Cătălina Pisică
 10  Jéssica Quintino
 96  Josipa Mamić
Line players 
 13  Nicoleta Balog
 24  Meike Schmelzer
 35  Liliana Venâncio

Back players
LB
 5  Alexandra Severin
 11  Karoline de Souza
 19  Maria Kanaval

CB
 8  Kristina Liščević
 29  Francielle da Rocha
 99  Marija Shteriova

RB
 2  Aneta Udriștioiu (c) 
 9  Jelena Lavko
 66  Mireya Gonzalez

Transfers
Transfers for the 2023–24 season

 Joining
  Kira Trusova (GK) (from  CSKA Moscow)
  Katarina Ježić (LP) (from  Vipers Kristiansand)
  Andreea Popa (CB) (from  Minaur Baia Mare)
  Corina Lupei (LW) (from  SCM Râmnicu Vâlcea with immediate effect) 

 Leaving
  Mayssa Pessoa (GK) (unknown destination)
  Liliana Venâncio (LP) (unknown destination)
  Jovana Sazdovska (LW) (to  CSM Slatina) (?)

References

External links
  

Romanian handball clubs
Liga Națională (women's handball) clubs
Handball clubs established in 1997
1997 establishments in Romania
Brăila